The 1911–12 Notre Dame men's ice hockey season was the inaugural season of play for the program.

Season
A year after Yale and Cornell played the first intercollegiate games held west of Cleveland, Notre Dame officially played its first ice hockey game. The team played only a single contest, against the Culver Military Academy in nearby Culver, Indiana, winning 7–1. Notre Dame's closest competition would have been Case or Western Reserve but both programs had ceased operation after the 1910–11 season while all western Pennsylvania schools had suspended their ice hockey teams in 1910. This left Notre Dame with no regional contemporaries to compete against and led to their abbreviated schedule.

Note: Notre Dame was not officially known as the 'Fighting Irish' until 1919.

Roster

Standings

Schedule and results

|-
!colspan=12 style=";" | Regular Season

References

Notre Dame Fighting Irish men's ice hockey seasons
Notre Dame
Notre Dame
Notre Dame
Notre Dame